Hisham ibn Isma'il al-Makhzumi was an eighth century Umayyad Caliphate official, and the maternal grandfather of caliph Hisham ibn 'Abd al-Malik. He served as the governor of Medina from 701 to 706.

Family
Hisham was a member of the Banu Makhzum, a clan of the Arab tribe of Quraysh, being a great-grandson of al-Walid ibn al-Mughira. Hisham gained prominence when his daughter A'isha married the fifth Umayyad caliph Abd al-Malik ibn Marwan. In 691 he became a grandfather to the future caliph Hisham ibn Abd al-Malik, who was reportedly named after him at A'isha's insistence. Hisham's sons Ibrahim and Muhammad, like their father under Abd al-Malik, served as governors of Medina for Hisham ibn Abd al-Malik. They fell out of favour during the reign of his successor al-Walid ibn Yazid and were tortured to death by Yusuf ibn Umar al-Thaqafi in 743. A third son, Khalid, participated in the failed rebellion of Hisham ibn Abd al-Malik's son Sulayman in 744 and was consequently executed by the caliph Marwan ibn Muhammad.

Governor of Medina
Abd al-Malik appointed Hisham, his father-in-law, governor of Medina in 701. During his time in that position he dismissed Nawfal ibn Musahiq al-Amiri from the head of the judiciary and appointed Amr ibn Khalid al-Zuraqi in his stead, and led the people of the city in rendering the oath of allegiance to Abd al-Malik's sons al-Walid I and Sulayman. When the faqih Sa'id ibn al-Musayyab refused to give the oath, Hisham ordered him to be beaten and imprisoned, and subjected him to a mock execution by having him marched to a mountain pass where individuals would normally be killed and crucified. Hisham also led the annual Hajj pilgrimages to Mecca in 703 and 704, and possibly those of 702/3 and 705 as well.

Following the death of Abd al-Malik in 705, Hisham was initially confirmed as governor by his successor al-Walid I. The new caliph disliked Hisham, however, and in early 706 he dismissed him in favour of Umar ibn Abd al-Aziz. Al-Walid also instructed Umar to display Hisham in front of the people of Medina, as a form of humiliation for his conduct during his governorship, but Hisham was spared from further harm after both Sa'id ibn al-Musayyab and the Alid Ali ibn al-Husayn ordered their followers to refrain from acts of retaliation against him.

Notes

References
 
 
 
 
 
 
 
 

8th-century Arabs
Umayyad governors of Medina
Banu Makhzum